The Syria men's national water polo team represents Syria in international water polo competitions and friendly matches.

Honours

Asian Beach Games
2010: 4th

Mediterranean Games

1987: 5th

References

External links
Syrian water polo official website
Complete 1987 Mediterranean Games Standings

Men's national water polo teams
National sports teams of Syria
Sport in Syria
Water polo in Syria